The Gatard Statoplan AG 02 Poussin (French: "Chick") was a light, single-seat sports airplane developed in France in the late 1950s and marketed for homebuilding. In layout, it was a low-wing cantilever monoplane of short-coupled design with fixed tailwheel undercarriage. Construction was a plywood-covered wooden structure throughout, and the cockpit was enclosed by a large perspex bubble canopy. The variable-incidence horizontal stabiliser was fitted with small endplates to provide extra directional stability but there were no separate elevators.

An unusual feature of the design was the aircraft's method of climbing. In most aircraft designs, climb is achieved (without change in engine power) by pitching the aircraft so that the angle of attack of the wings increases, thereby increasing lift. The Poussin, however, was designed to climb by lowering specially-designed flaps and trimming the tailplane to balance out any change in pitch, therefore allowing the aircraft to achieve its maximum rate of climb while keeping the fuselage within 4° of level. The extra drag created by the lowered flaps was balanced by drag saved by keeping the fuselage level.

Specifications (Second prototype)

References

 
 
 
 

1950s French sport aircraft
Homebuilt aircraft
Gatard aircraft
Single-engined tractor aircraft
Low-wing aircraft
Aircraft first flown in 1957